The Church of Jesus Christ of Latter-day Saints (LDS Church) has always taught gender roles as an important part of their doctrine, however, leaders have only recently begun directly addressing gender diversity and the experiences of transgender, non-binary, intersex, and other gender minorities whose gender identity and expression differ from the norm.

Background

Gender identity and roles play an important part in Mormon theology which teaches a strict binary of spiritual gender as literal offspring of divine parents. Part of Sunday church meetings are currently divided by biological sex, and for most of the 1800s church presidents Joseph Smith and Brigham Young had men, women, and children sit separately for all Sunday meetings. Studies that shape current psychological understanding of expressions and identities for sexuality and gender show strong evidence that gender and sexuality are "separate, but related" aspects of a person and stem from similar biological origins.

Current teachings

Current teachings on gender identity include an official church website on homosexuality which states that "same-sex attraction and gender dysphoria are very different ... those who experience gender dysphoria may or may not also experience same-sex attraction, and the majority of those who experience same-sex attraction do not desire to change their gender. From a psychological and ministerial perspective, the two are different." Other notable teachings on gender have included an official statement made in 1995 by the LDS Church's First Presidency and Quorum of the Twelve Apostles which states that "gender is an essential characteristic of individual pre-mortal, mortal, and eternal identity and purpose". However, in the past, church president Joseph Fielding Smith, stated that he believed that those who did not reach the celestial kingdom in the afterlife would be "neither man nor woman, merely immortal beings".

LDS Church leaders have stated that they have unfinished business in teaching on the difficult and sensitive topic of transgender individuals. Church spokesman Eric Hawkins stated in March 2016 that LDS bishops recognize that "each case is different" and "difficult and sensitive" and that they recognize the "emotional pain" many gender minorities feel. He also reaffirmed the church's views that "gender is part of our eternal God-given identity and purpose" and stated that the Church does not baptize "those who are planning trans-sexual  operations" and that undergoing a "trans-sexual  operation" may imperil the membership of a church member, which seems to include gender-affirming surgery like chest surgery (i.e. top surgery).

Baptismal candidates considering gender-affirming surgery are not allowed to be baptized, and those who have already had one need special clearance from the First Presidency through the local full-time mission president before baptism. Subsequent ordinances such as receiving the priesthood and temple endowments, however, are only done according to birth sex. Members that gender express through clothing or a pronoun change differing from their sex assigned at birth will receive membership restrictions and a notation on their membership records.

Many conservative groups within Mormonism have disagreed with the Church's more accepting stance on transgender people, viewing it (and LGBTQ rights in general) as a threat to the traditional family unit. The Mormon-affiliated Deseret Nation (#DezNat) community on Twitter, while praised by conservative members of the Church, has been criticised as inciting violence against transgender individuals and the broader LGBTQ community, ex-Mormon apostates (blood atonement), and pornographic film actors.

Gender diverse Mormons and former Mormons

While the exact portion of LDS Church-goers who identify as something other than cisgender is unknown, a large 2017 survey of mostly LDS-identifying BYU students found that .2% noted their gender identity as transgender or something other than cisgender male or female. For nationwide comparison, a 2017 meta-analysis of 20 separate large surveys (with sample sizes ranging from over 30,000 US adults to over 165,000 each) found a conservative estimate of .39% for the portion of US adults who self-identify as transgender.

Several transgender and other gender diverse individuals with Mormon background have received media attention. These include Misty Snow, Eri Hayward, Grayson Moore, Emmett Claren, Sara Jade Woodhouse, Ann Pack, Alison Kluzek, and Annabel Jensen. Others who have shared some of their experiences include London Flynn, Augustus Crosby, Alex Autry, and Kimberly Anderson, as well as former and current BYU students Cammie Vanderveur, Jami Claire, Andy Winder, and Kris Irvin.

Former stake president and church architect Laurie Lee Hall was excommunicated by her Utah local leaders in June 2017 for socially transitioning to express her gender identity as a transgender woman. She had experienced years of suicidal ideation and gender dysphoria before being released as a stake president in 2012 due to her identity and had come out to her entire congregation a year prior to her excommunication in July 2016.

Organizations that support Mormon gender diverse individuals include Affirmation and USGA.

Teachings on intersex individuals
In February of 2020 the LDS Church issued a new General Handbook of policies, which included a section on individuals born intersex. The new policies and guidelines noted that for persons born intersex, the decision to determine a child's sex is left to the parents, with the guidance of medical professionals, and that such decisions can be made at birth or can be delayed until medically necessary.

Prior to the February 19 changes in church policy and guidelines, the LDS Church had no publicly available policy or statements on intersex persons. The only publicly available policies were around binary transgender persons who were accepted in the church and could be baptized, but could not receive the priesthood or enter the temple if they were considering or had undergone elective sex reassignment surgery with no mention of those who were born with physically ambiguous or biosex-non-conforming physical traits and features, or for non-binary, agender, or genderqueer individuals who did not undergo surgery.

Further teachings

Church leaders and scholars have made a number of statements regarding gender. For instance, the apostle David A. Bednar has stated that gender defines much of who we are, why we're on earth, and what we do and become since god made male and female spirits different as part of a divine plan. Another apostle, Russell Ballard taught that the mortal natures of men and women were specified by God. Additionally, apostle Harold B. Lee taught that the "so-called 'transsexuality' doctrine" was hellish and false since God didn't place female spirits in male bodies and vice versa. Church president Spencer W. Kimball addressed the BYU student body in 1974 and stated that sex reassignment surgeries were an appalling travesty.

Members outside of top leaders have also discussed gender. Scholars at the church-owned BYU created a book on the Family Proclamation discussing Mormon views on eternal gender distinctions. In contribution to a work on the Family Proclamation, Robert Millet wrote going against church-taught gender roles would cause unhappiness and a lack of fulfillment before and after death.

Past teachings on relationship to homosexuality

Current church stances on gender identity and expression and sexual orientation are that they are different and that there is "unfinished business in teaching on [transgender situations]". The official website on homosexuality states that "same-sex attraction and gender dysphoria are very different ... those who experience gender dysphoria may or may not also experience same-sex attraction, and the majority of those who experience same-sex attraction do not desire to [socially or surgically transition ]. From a psychological and ministerial perspective, the two are different." However, in the past the church taught that homosexuality was caused by gender non-conformity or confusion about gender roles, and the vast majority of allusions to gender minorities were made from the perspective of discussing the etiology and mutability of minority sexual orientations rather than non-cisgender gender identities and expression per se. On several occasions while discussing homosexuality, church leaders have alluded to their belief that the homosexual individual may be confused about their gender identity or gender roles. Examples of this include the following:

 1973 – A guide for bishops and stake presidents titled "Homosexuality: Welfare Services Packet 1" stated that homosexuality was related to gender confusion and that the man or woman must learn proper behavior for their respective sex.
 1976 – A general conference address by apostle Boyd K. Packer stated that gay attractions are not inborn or permanent since "there is no mismatching of bodies and spirits" and boys are meant to be "masculine, manly men". The speech was later printed in a widely distributed pamphlet from 1980 to 2016.
 1978 – The apostle Packer further stated that same-sex sexual behavior is often rooted in the desires of an insecure woman or man to try and become more feminine or masculine respectively.
 1981 – In the April general conference, church seventy Hartman Rector Jr. stated that homosexual people were not born that way because "[t]here are no female spirits trapped in male bodies and vice versa."
 1981 – A church guide for LDS Social Services employees instructed that "the homosexually oriented man ... does not fully understand how a masculine man is supposed to think and act."
 1993 – Packer gave his May 18 "Talk to the All-Church Coordinating Council" (composed of the First Presidency, the Quorum of the Twelve, and the Presiding Bishopric) in which he stated that a man who self-identifies as a homosexual has "gender disorientation".
 1995 – The church's Family Services manual advised practitioners that "in the homosexual male this core gender identity has become confused".
 2006 – The apostle Jeffrey R. Holland was interviewed by PBS in March during which he used the phrase "struggling with gender identity" and "gender confusion" as synonyms for homosexuality.
 2006 – In an interview, Lance B. Wickman of the Seventy used the term "gender orientation" five times as a synonym for "sexual orientation".

See also
 Timeline of LGBT Mormon history
 Homosexuality and the Church of Jesus Christ of Latter-day Saints
 LGBT Mormon suicides
 Transgender people and religion
 Christianity and transgender
 Gender and religion
 Complementarianism

References

LGBT and Mormonism
Transgender topics and religion
Sexuality and Mormonism
Mormonism and women